Tatar Ka Chor is a Bollywood action film. It was released in 1940.

References

External links
 

1940 films
1940s Hindi-language films
Indian black-and-white films
Indian action films
1940s action films
Hindi-language action films